The Lunana language, Lunanakha (Dzongkha: ལུང་ནག་ན་ཁ་; Wylie: lung-nag-na-kha) is a Tibetic language spoken in Bhutan (Lunana Gewog, Gasa District) by some 700 people in 1998. Most are yak-herding pastoralists. Lunana is a variety of Dzongkha, the national language of Bhutan.

See also
 Lunana Gewog
 Lunana village
 Languages of Bhutan

References

Languages of Bhutan
Languages written in Tibetan script
South Bodish languages